George Edmund O'Hearn (June 6, 1880 – February 1, 1967) was an American football and baseball player and coach.  He served as the head football coach at Massachusetts Agricultural College—now the University of Massachusetts Amherst—in 1906 and at The College of William & Mary from 1908 to 1909, compiling a career college football record of 11–17–2.  O'Hearn was also the head baseball coach at William & Mary from 1909 to 1910.

A native of Pittsfield, Massachusetts, O'Hearn played football as a halfback and baseball as a third baseman at Massachusetts Agricultural College.  He was captain of the 1903 Massachusetts Aggies football team.  O'Hearn on February 1, 1967, at St. Luke's Hospital—now known as Providence Court—in Pittsfield.

Head coaching record

Football

References

1880 births
1967 deaths
American football halfbacks
Baseball third basemen
UMass Minutemen baseball players
UMass Minutemen football coaches
UMass Minutemen football players
William & Mary Tribe baseball coaches
William & Mary Tribe football coaches
Sportspeople from Pittsfield, Massachusetts
Players of American football from Massachusetts
Baseball players from Massachusetts